Ottar Kaldhol  (born 30 September 1946) is a Norwegian politician.

He was born in Ulstein to Hans Kaldhol and Judith Løseth. He was elected representative to the Storting for the period 1993–1997 for the Labour Party.

References

1946 births
Living people
People from Ulstein
Labour Party (Norway) politicians
Members of the Storting